John Hartman  (born 1950) is an Ontario-based painter and printmaker.

Career 
John Hartman, born in Midland, Ontario, was raised on the southern and eastern shores of Georgian Bay. In the process of obtaining a degree at McMaster University in Hamilton which he finished in 1973, he took courses in fine art from instructor George Wallace who was enthusiastic about German Expressionism. He also was friendly with David Blackwood, then an art instructor, whom he had met when he attended Camp Hurontario, a boys’ camp. The poet Douglas LePan was also a friend and mentor.

Work
Hartman has said that the artists who inspired him include figures from art history such as J.M.W. Turner, Albrecht Altdorfer, Chaïm Soutine, Oskar Kokoschka and in Canada, David Milne and the Group of Seven, among others. In his art, he has favored an aerial view of the land, even renting planes to see the impact humans have made on landscape – their histories and memories. He sees cities as living organisms, combined with their geography so his narrative is a complex mixture. In 2007, he said:
One of the things which astonished me was realizing the ways in which my Western civilization tended to regard itself as separate from the land, when it would have been much healthier to have conceived of the world as the Aboriginals do – as a huge and constantly changing organism and ourselves as part of it.

Hartman's work has been discussed by critics along with that of David T. Alexander and others. He has been called an artist who, in the "true tradition of Canadian painters, is not afraid of visiting the far-flung edges of this country, pursuing subjects, painting them in his edgy style". 

His works are in the collections of many public galleries such as the McMichael Canadian Art Collection, Kleinburg; Museum London, Ontario; the Robert McLaughlin Gallery, Oshawa; the Winnipeg Art Gallery; and elsewhere.

Selected exhibitions
Although Hartman has a lengthy exhibition history beginning with a solo exhibition at Trinity College, University of Toronto, in 1972, and with many shows nationally and internationally, largely in the 1980s, it took Painting the Bay: Recent Work by John Hartman at the McMichael Canadian Art Collection in 1993, large-scale paintings of Georgian Bay, aerial views of thickly-painted landscape, to bring him to critical attention. In the skies of this series, Hartman painted stories about the places he depicted to achieve his concept of the land as being more than mere landscape.

Hartman continued to receive national exposure with the exhibition and book Big North: The Paintings of John Hartman, a major exhibition of Hartman`s works, organized by Museum London and the Tom Thomson Art Gallery which toured Canada between 1999 and 2002. In 2003, he began to paint aerial views of cities as living organisms. These paintings made up the exhibition and book Cities curated by Stuart Reid which toured Canada and internationally from 2007 to 2009. In 2014, the Woodstock Art Gallery organized John Hartman: Many Lives Mark This Place with a book by Ian M. Thom, an exhibition of a series of 30 portraits of Canadian authors and the places that were important to them. The show travelled to the McMichael Canadian Art Gallery and elsewhere.

Honours and awards
He is a member of the Royal Canadian Academy. In 2020, he received the Order of Canada. The John Hartman Award from the MacLaren Art Centre in Barrie, ON was established in 2016. In 2018, Olivia Whetung received the award.

Personal life
John Hartman lives and has his studio in Lafontaine, Ontario.

Record sale prices
At Waddington`s Canadian Fine Art Auction, November 13–18, 2021, Hartman`s Manitou Dock, 1993, a diptych, 182.9 x 304.8 cms, illustrated in John Hartman and Jean Blodgett, Painting the Bay: Recent Work by John Hartman (McMichael Canadian Art Collection: 
Kleinburg, Ontario, 1993) on page 25, estimated at $10,000-15,000, realized a price of $40,800.

References

Bibliography

1950 births
Living people
Landscape artists
20th-century Canadian painters
21st-century Canadian painters
Canadian landscape painters
Members of the Royal Canadian Academy of Arts
Members of the Order of Canada
Canadian painters